Illovo Beach is a small coastal resort on the banks of the Illovo River in KwaZulu-Natal, South Africa. It is now part of eThekwini. The river was named by the Zulus "iLovo" because of the mlovo trees growing on its banks.

References

Populated places in eThekwini Metropolitan Municipality